King of the Grey Islands is the ninth studio album by Swedish doom metal band Candlemass, released on 22 June 2007. It is the first album recorded following the departure of vocalist Messiah Marcolin, who left the band during the pre-production phase of the album. He was replaced by Robert Lowe, who would stay with the band until his departure in June 2012.

A digipak version contains two bonus studio session tracks with Robert Lowe. The album was also released as a double vinyl LP with the bonus track "Edgar Grey". A tin box set edition (limited to 500 copies) was also released, which included a bonus 3" CD with two bonus tracks: "Black Dwarf" and "Demonia 6 (early version)". "Black Dwarf" is a re-recording with Lowe on vocals. These songs also appear on the "Black Dwarf" 7".

Upon its release, the album was met with widespread acclaim from both critics and fans.

Track listing

Personnel
Candlemass
Robert Lowe – vocals
Mats Björkman – rhythm guitar
Lars Johansson – lead guitar
Leif Edling – bass, producer
Jan Lindh – drums

Additional musicians
Carl Westholm – keyboards

Production
Chris Laney – engineer, post-production fixes
Andreas Osslund – engineering on track 4
Peter Tägtgren – mixing at The Abyss in March 2007
Sören von Malmborg – mastering
Tomas Arfert – cover design and illustration

Charts

References

Candlemass (band) albums
2007 albums
Nuclear Blast albums